"Fall for You" is a song by Secondhand Serenade, the solo project of John Vesely. It was the first single from Secondhand Serenade's second studio album A Twist in My Story (2008). The single was released as a digital download on January 21, 2008, peaking, after receiving a lot of airplay in summer months, in September 2008, at No. 8 on the Billboard Pop 100 charts and No. 21 on the Billboard Hot 100 charts.

The song debuted at number 27 on the Australian ARIA Singles Charts and has since peaked at number 19. The song was certified 2× Platinum in the United States by the RIAA. This song is written in the key of C major.

Music video
A music video was released a week after the single was released. The video was shown on MTV's Total Request Live. It features John Vesely playing the piano and performing the song intercut with footage of Vesely with a woman.

Charts

Weekly charts

Year-end charts

Certification

References

2007 songs
2008 singles
Song recordings produced by Butch Walker
Glassnote Records singles